Below is an alphabetical list of famous novelists, poets, and playwrights, who are Belarusian or of Belarusian origin.

A
Aleś Adamovič (1927–1994), writer and critic.
Kastuś Akuła (1925–2008), writer and journalist.
Śviatłana Aleksijevič (born 1938), investigative journalist and prose writer.
Francišak Alachnovič (1883–1944), writer, journalist and Gulag survivor.
Natalla Arsieńnieva (1903–1997), playwright, poet, and translator.

B
Alhierd Baharevich (b. 1975), writer and translator.
Maksim Bahdanovič (1891–1917), poet, journalist and literary critic.
Francišak Bahuševič (1840–1900), poet, writer and lawyer.
Ryhor Baradulin (1935–2014), poet, essayist and translator
Źmitrok Biadula (Samuił Płaŭnik) (1886–1941), poet, writer and activist.
Alexander Bogdanov (1873–1928), philosopher and revolutionary.
Janka Bryl (1917–2006), short-story writer.
Symon Budny (c. 1530 – 1593), humanist scholar and educator.
Vasil Bykaŭ (1924–2003), novelist.

C
Ciotka (Ałaiza Paškievič) (1876–1916), poet and political activist.

Č
Jan Čačot (1796–1847), romantic poet and ethnologist.
Kuźma Čorny (1900–1944), novelist.

D
Siarhiej Dubaviec (born 1959), journalist and writer.
Uładzimier Duboŭka (1900–1976), poet and nationalist.
Vincent Dunin-Marcinkievič (c. 1808 – 1884), writer, poet, dramatist and social activist.

F
Sasha Filipenko (b. 1984), writer and journalist.

H
Maksim Harecki (1893–1939), folklorist and scholar.
Ciška Hartny (Źmicier Žyłunovič) (1887–1937), poet, writer and journalist.
Alés Harun (1887–1920), poet, story writer and dramatist.
Larysa Hienijuš (1910–1983), poet, writer and nationalist.
Adam Hlobus (b. 1958), writer, poet, and artist.

K
Karuś Kahaniec (1868-1918), poet and writer
Kastuś Kalinoŭski (1838–1864), writer, journalist, lawyer and revolutionary.
Ihnat Kančeŭski (pen name Ihnat Abdziralovič, 1896-1923), poet, philosopher and publicist
Uładzimier Karatkievič (1930–1984), romantic writer.
Hienadź Klaŭko (1932–1979), poet and translator.
Jakub Kołas (Kanstancin Mickievič) (1882–1956), poet, dramatist and writer.
Moyshe Kulbak (1896–1937), writer. 
Janka Kupała (Ivan Łucevič) (1882–1942), poet and writer.

Ł
Vaclaŭ Łastoŭski (1883–1938), critic, literary historian and politician.

M
Viktar Martinowich (b. 1977), writer and journalist.
Janka Maŭr (1883–1971), writer.
Ivan Mielež (1921–1976), novelist and playwright.

N
Uładzimier Niaklajeŭ (born 1946), poet and writer.

O
Napaleon Orda (1807–1883), musician, composer, artist and writer.

P
Zianon Paźniak (b. 1944), politician.
Sergiusz Piasecki (1901–1964), writer.
Alaksandar Patupa (1945–2009), philosopher, scientist and human rights activist.
Aleś Prudnikaŭ (1910–1941), poet.
Pavał Prudnikaŭ (1911–2000), writer.
Jazep Pušča (1902–1964), poet.

R
Franciszka Urszula Radziwiłłowa (1705–1753), dramatist and writer.
Ryhor Reles (1913–2004), Jewish writer in Yiddish.
Alexander Rypinski (1809-1886), poet, translator and folklorist.

S
Leŭ Sapieha (1557–1663), nobleman and statesman.
Francysk Skaryna (c. 1490 – c. 1551), publisher and translator.
Uładzimier Sodal (1937–2015), specialist in literature, journalist, researcher, local historian.
Uładzisłaŭ Syrakomla (1823–1862), romantic poet, writer and translator.

Š
Ivan Šamiakin (1921–1984), socialist realist writer.
Fabijan Šantyr (1887 - 1920), Belarusian poet, writer and public figure who is regarded as “the first victim of [the Bolsheviks] in…Belarusian politics and literature”.
Karłas Šerman (1934–2005), translator.

T
Maksim Tank (Jaŭhien Skurko) (1912–1995), poet and translator.
Kiryła Turaŭski (1130–1182), bishop and saint.
Siarhiej Trachimionak (b. 1950), writer, screenwriter.

V
Lavon Volski (born 1965), musician, writer and painter.
Joannis Vislicensis (c. 1485/90–1520), epic poet.

References

Belarusian
 
Writers